Bridge Lake may refer to:

Bridge Lake (British Columbia), a lake in the South Cariboo region of the Interior of British Columbia, Canada
Bridge Lake, British Columbia, a community located on Bridge Lake, British Columbia, Canada
Bridge Lake Provincial Park, a provincial park located on Bridge Lake, British Columbia, Canada
 Bridge Lake in Park County, Montana, United States